Page House is a historic home located at Cochecton in Sullivan County, New York.  It was built in 1892 is a large two story, cross gabled, frame Queen Anne style dwelling.  It features asymmetrical massing, picturesque roofline, domed corner tower, decorative shingled surfaces, and an elaborately detailed verandah.  An extension was added in 1905.  Also on the property are a springhouse and small barn.

It was added to the National Register of Historic Places in 1992.

References

Houses on the National Register of Historic Places in New York (state)
Queen Anne architecture in New York (state)
Houses completed in 1892
Houses in Sullivan County, New York
National Register of Historic Places in Sullivan County, New York